Sri Tanjung is a state constituency in Negeri Sembilan, Malaysia that is currently represented in the Negeri Sembilan State Legislative Assembly in 2018. The constituency is currently under the  The current member of parliament for Sri Tanjung is Ravi a/l Munnusamy.

The state constituency was created in the 2018 redistribution replacing Port Dickson state constituency and was mandated to return a single member to the Negeri Sembilan State Legislative Assembly under the first past the post voting system.

The current voter composition of Sri Tanjung is 36.59% Malay, 31.02% Indian, 30.88% Chinese and 1.52% Others.

Polling districts 
Kampong Paya, Kampong Arab, Kampong Chokra, Pekan Port Dickson

History

Election results

References 

Negeri Sembilan State Legislative Assembly
Negeri Sembilan state constituencies